Requa House is a historic home located at Stuyvesant in Columbia County, New York.  It was built in 1904 and is a -story Colonial Revival–style dwelling with two porticoed facades.  It is set on a slightly graded lot and features a complex roof configuration, with hipped and gable roof sections, gable dormers, and a balustraded widow's walk.  Also on the property is a large barn, a smaller brick barn, and a shed.

It was added to the National Register of Historic Places in 2002.

References

Houses on the National Register of Historic Places in New York (state)
Colonial Revival architecture in New York (state)
Houses completed in 1904
Houses in Columbia County, New York
National Register of Historic Places in Columbia County, New York